This article shows list of rivers of Gujarat grouped by name, origin, length and catchment area.

References

 
Rivers, List of, Gujarat
Gujarat, List of rivers
Environment of Gujarat